Isadore Bernstein (November 26, 1876 – October 19, 1944) was an American screenwriter. He wrote screenplays for more than 60 films between 1914 and 1938. He was born in New York, New York and died in Hollywood, California from a heart attack. Bernstein was the West Coast studio manager for Carl Laemmle. Although he acted as Laemmle's representative concerning many business issues, he was not a principal as was Pat Powers in the formation of Universal Film Manufacturing Company (Universal Pictures). 

Bernstein was Carl Laemmle's brother-in-law.

Selected filmography

 Nuts in May (1917)
 Tarzan of the Apes (1918)
 The Great Alone (1922)
 The Miracle Baby (1923)
 Pure Grit (1923)
 The Red Warning (1923)
 The Man from Wyoming (1924)
 Fighting Fury (1924)
 The Back Trail (1924)
 Big Timber (1924)
 Ridgeway of Montana (1924)
The Measure of a Man (1924)
 The Sunset Trail (1924)
 The Sign of the Cactus (1925)
 Ridin' Thunder (1925)
 The Great Circus Mystery (1925)
 Perils of the Wild (1925)
The Meddler (1925)
 Ace of Spades (1925)
 His People (1925)
 The Burning Trail (1925)
 The Arizona Sweepstakes (1926)
 The Shamrock and the Rose (1927)
 The Valley of Hell (1927)
 The Wild West Show (1928)
 The Masked Angel (1928)
 The Devil's Cage (1928)
 Life's Mockery (1928)
George Washington Cohen (1928)
 Broken Barriers (1928)
 Lucky Boy (1929)
 Daughters of Desire (1929)
 Montmartre Rose (1929)
 The Clean Up (1929)
 The Dream Melody (1929)
 One Splendid Hour (1929)
 For the Service (1936)
 Tugboat Princess (1936)
 Lightning Carson Rides Again (1938)
 Six-Gun Trail (1938)

References

External links

1876 births
1944 deaths
Writers from New York City
American male screenwriters
Screenwriters from New York (state)
20th-century American male writers
20th-century American screenwriters